Nellie Cline Steenson (December 7, 1885 - April 1, 1984) was an American politician and lawyer who served in the Kansas House of Representatives, Idaho House of Representatives and Idaho Senate. A Democrat, she was the elected county attorney of Pawnee County, Kansas before her 1920 election to the Kansas House of Representatives, where she served two terms. Moving to Pocatello, Idaho in 1935, she entered Idaho politics in 1942 and was the first woman elected to the Idaho Senate. She served a total of  eight terms in the Idaho Legislature.

Senator Steenson was the first woman to argue a case before the Kansas Supreme Court.

A graduate of Baker University in Baldwin City, Kansas and a native of Larned, Kansas, she was part of the second group of women to serve in the Kansas House of Representatives, serving with Rep. Minnie J. Grinstead, Rep. Minnie Minnich and Rep. Ida Walker. During her tenure in the Kansas Legislature, she authored the state's first law providing protections to farm labor. During her tenure in the Idaho Legislature she passed legislation to provide pensions for retired police officers and firefighters and worked to promote the University of Idaho.

1921-1922 Kansas House of Representatives Committee Assignments
 Education
 Irrigation
 Judiciary
 State Institutions

1923-1924 Kansas House of Representatives Committee Assignments
 Agriculture
 Buildings and Grounds
 Education
 Judiciary

References

1885 births
1984 deaths
Democratic Party members of the Kansas House of Representatives
Democratic Party members of the Idaho House of Representatives
Democratic Party Idaho state senators
People from Pawnee County, Kansas
People from Pocatello, Idaho
Baker University alumni
Women state legislators in Kansas
Women state legislators in Idaho
Kansas lawyers
Idaho lawyers
20th-century American politicians
20th-century American women politicians
20th-century American lawyers